Nazareth Canvas and Garment Factory is one of the organizations of the Ethiopian Defense Industry. It produces and supplies military uniforms, canvas, leather, and strap products to the Ethiopian National Defense Force.

History
The factory was established in 1988 to produce various canvas and leather quartermaster items. In 1990, a weaving unit was established to produce inputs for the canvas sewing unit. In 1991, a tailoring unit was set up to supply different types of military clothes.

In the late 1990s, the then administrative agency of the Defense organizations restructured the company to enter the civilian market. The factory was upgraded with new equipment to increase its production capacity and make it competitive.

Structure
The factory is structured in four production units: 
 Canvas sewing
 Garment
 Weaving
 Embroidery

References
 FDRE Defense Industry, May 2008

Military industrial facilities of Ethiopia
Military uniforms